Kaun? Who Did It? is an Indian interactive crime show that debuted on Flipkart Video on January 9, 2021. The series stars Indian actors Sushant Singh as Detective Adi Bhagat and Samvedna Suwalka as Inspector Malini. The location of the series is set in Mumbai, Maharashtra, India. The series was produced by Guneet Monga's production house, Sikhya Entertainment with Sunjoy Shekhar as writer and Umesh Bisht as showrunner. The show concluded its first season with 35 episodes. The second season was announced by Flipkart on its official YouTube channel on 20 May 2021 with a trailer and launched on 24 May 2021.

Overview 
Kaun? Who Did It? is an interactive crime fiction show that follows a retired ex-cop turned private detective, Adi Bhagat, and his protégé inspector Malini. Launched on 9 January 2021, season 1 has 33 daily episodes with a new murder case every day. After Adi and Malini go through the case details, suspect interrogations and evidence, the show allows users to play detective where they are able to guess who the killer is before Adi reveals it himself. If the user is right, they can win prizes from Flipkart.

Cast 
 Sushant Singh as Detective Aadi Bhagat
 Samvedna Suwalka as Inspector Malini
 Himanshu Bamzai as Lakshya
 Shabaaz Abdullah Badi as Manav 
 Deepshikha Nagpal
 Prachi Hadda as Moira
 Kavita Banerjee as Suzzanne Khambata
 Priya Arora as Poonam

Production 
The first look of the series was released on 23 December 2020 with an intriguing poster that features Sushant Singh and Samvedna Suwalka. The poster uncovers a somber Sushant oozing with mystery along with assistant police inspector, Samvedna, while they solve complicated crime mysteries.

The show was announced using an optical illusion teaser on the 26th of December on Flipkart Video's YouTube followed by the official trailer which was launched on the 6th of January 2021.

Release 
Kaun? Who Did It? is a Flipkart Video original series which aired on the Flipkart app from January 9, 2021.

References

External links 
 

Hindi-language web series
2021 web series debuts
Indian crime television series
Indian web series
Interactive films
2021 Indian television series debuts
Flipkart